The progressive stack is a technique used to give marginalized groups a greater chance to speak.  It is sometimes an introduction to, or stepping stone to, consensus decision-making in which simple majorities have less power. The technique works by allowing people to speak on the basis of race, sex, and other group membership, with preference given to members of groups that are considered the most marginalized.

Overview
The progressive stack technique attempts to counter what its proponents believe is a flaw in traditional representative democracy, where the majority is heard while the minority or non-dominant groups are silenced or ignored. In practice, "majority culture" may be interpreted by progressive stack practitioners to mean white people, heterosexual people, or men while non-dominant groups include women, people who are lesbian, gay, bisexual, transgender, or queer, people of color, and very young or older people.

The "stack" in the Occupy movement is the list of speakers who are commenting on proposals or asking questions in public meetings. Anyone can request to be added to the stack. In meetings that don't use the progressive stack, people typically speak in the order they were added to the queue. In meetings that use the progressive stack, people from non-dominant groups are allowed to speak before people from dominant groups, by facilitators, or stack-keepers, urging speakers to "step forward, or step back" based on which racial, age, or gender group they belong to.

Criticism
A. Barton Hinkle, a columnist for the Richmond Times-Dispatch, has expressed the opinion that "lining up speakers by race and gender might not seem fair on an individual level", and suggests that proponents of the progressive stack care more about class struggle than individual concerns.

See also
Intersectionality

References

Majority–minority relations
Occupy movement
Occupy movement in the United States
Group decision-making